Radha Ka Sangam is a 1992 Hindi romance film directed and produced by Kirti Kumar. The film features Govinda, Juhi Chawla, Kirti Kumar and Abhimanyyu Raj Singh as main characters. Originally, Divya Bharti was cast in the role of Radha, her first role. She was dropped due to disagreements with the director and Juhi Chawla was signed.

Synopsis
Radha Ka Sangam is based on re-incarnation. It is shown that Govinda (Govinda) and Radha (Juhi Chawla) love each other and they get married, but after the marriage, things do not go in their favour. A lot of tragic incidents happen in their lives. Govinda gets a jail sentence and Radha is also not well outside. When Govinda gets out of jail, another tragedy strikes. Do they meet in their next birth? What happens next?

Cast
Govinda as Govinda
Juhi Chawla as Radha
Abhimanyyu Raj Singh
Mala Sinha
Kiran Kumar
Kirti Kumar as Chander
Disco Shanti
Ragesh Asthana

Music

The music of the film was composed by Anu Malik and the lyrics were penned by Hasrat Jaipuri and Shaily Shailendra. "Prem Hai Janmo Ka Sangam" and "Kanha Kanha Tu Hai Sabka Kanha", which become very popular that time, were both song sung by Anuradha Paudwal.

References

External links

1990s Hindi-language films
1992 films
Films scored by Anu Malik